Munaq (also Romanized as Mūnaq and Mownaq; also known as Monaq and Muna) is a village in Kandovan Rural District, Kandovan District, Meyaneh County, East Azerbaijan Province, Iran. At the 2006 census, its population was 259, in 62 families.

References 

Populated places in Meyaneh County